The Marching Sound Machine is the official marching band of North Carolina Central University. The Sound Machine performs pre-game and halftime shows at all North Carolina Central home games and travels to most away games.

History 

The history of the North Carolina Central's Marching Band dates back to the 1930s when Dr. Stephen Junius Wright, an assistant professor of education at the then North Carolina College in Durham, was asked to organize the first marching band. The inaugural band was believed to have about 25 musicians.

In 1958, Dr. Richard Henry Lee Jones, became the fifth band director to lead the program. Jones is credited for growing the band to around 120 members and gaining both national and local recognition for their performances. In 1960, the band performed at the inauguration for then Governor of North Carolina, Terry Sanford. The following year, the band performed during halftime of the New York Giants-Dallas Cowboys football game in front of 56,000 fans at Yankee Stadium.

Following the tenure of Dr. Jones, a number of succeeding directors carried on the legacy of the band program, including Ms. Robyn Reaves who in 1997 became the first female band director in the CIAA. In 2001, Mr. Jorim Reid was named band director. Reid was responsible for a number of changes to the program, including the introduction of marching techniques commonly found in corp style marching. Under Reid's leadership the Marching Sound Machine increased to around 200 members, and made a number of national appearances including six appearances at the Honda Battle of the Bands in Atlanta, Georgia and participation in the 122nd Rose Parade in Pasadena, California. In 2015,  Mr. Thurman D. Hollins assumed leadership as director of bands.

Leadership 
Directly overseeing the Sound Machine is Mr. Thurman D. Hollins. Hollins received his bachelor's degree in music education from Norfolk State University. He also holds a master's degree in music education from Winthrop University, and is a Doctoral candidate for a Ph.D in Music Education from Georgia State University. Hollins has held positions as director of bands for Saint Augustine’s University, and served as assistant director at Johnson C. Smith University.

Composition 
The Marching Sound Machine contains numerous woodwind, brass, percussion, and auxiliary members, divided into section which are run by their respective section leaders. woodwind instruments include clarinets, piccolos, and saxophones sections. The brass instruments consists of the trumpet, mellophone, trombone, baritone, and sousaphone sections. The percussion section contains snare, tenor and bass drums; in addition to cymbal players. Members of the band's auxiliary units include the drum majors, Color guard, and dancers

Marching style 
As is the style commonly found in many Showstyle bands, The Sound Machine utilizes a variation of the high step marching style. This involves the lifting of the knee with legs directly in front, thighs parallel to the ground, and toes pointed downward. When the leg is elevated, there should be a 90-degree angle with the body and the thigh, and a 90-degree angle with the thigh and the shin. The leg is then lowered, and this is repeated with the other leg. This is informally referred to as the "chair step".

Notable Performances 
 1960 Inauguration of the Governor of North Carolina
 1961 New York Giants vs Dallas Cowboys Halftime in Yankee Stadium
 2005 Honda Battle of the Bands
 2006  Honda Battle of the Bands
 2007  Honda Battle of the Bands
 2008  Honda Battle of the Bands
 2009  Honda Battle of the Bands
 2010  Honda Battle of the Bands
 2011 Rose Parade

References 

North Carolina Central University
North Carolina Central Eagles football
Musical groups established in 1938
Mid-Eastern Athletic Conference marching bands
1938 establishments in North Carolina